Mahanoy City (pronounced MAHA-noy, also MA-noy locally) is a borough located  southwest of Wilkes-Barre and 13 miles southwest of Hazleton, in northern Schuylkill County, Pennsylvania, United States. It is part of the Coal Region of Pennsylvania and is located entirely within, but is not part of, Mahanoy Township. 

The name Mahanoy is believed to be a variation of the Native American word Maghonioy, or "the salt deposits".

History
Mahanoy City, originally a part of Mahanoy township, was settled in 1859 and incorporated as a borough by decree of the Court of Quarter Sessions of Schuylkill County on December 16, 1863. It was served by branches of the Lehigh Valley and the Philadelphia & Reading railways.

Mahanoy City lies in a valley in the Pennsylvania Coal Region and was a major center of anthracite production; the area was embroiled in the Molly Maguires incidents. In 2010, the borough erected the Molly Maguire Historic Park, which features a Zenos Frudakis statue of a hooded miner on a gallows about to be hanged.

The borough's principal industries remain the mining and shipping of coal, although the demand for it has steadily declined since its peak in the late nineteenth and early twentieth centuries. In 1930 the St. Nicholas Coal Breaker was built and went into operation in 1932. A controlled explosion destroyed the breaker in March 2018.

Fire clay abounds locally. The manufacturing of shirts, bedding and foundry products is also fairly prominent.

In 1948, Mahanoy City became the first municipality in the country to have cable TV.

Geography
Mahanoy City is located at  (40.812413, -76.140223), with PA 54 as a main thoroughfare and through road, serving as a main street named Centre Street. To the west it connects to Shenandoah thence to the Susquehanna Valley and to the east reaches through several unincorporated villages then passes through Barnesville as Pine Creek Dr. and then serves Hometown as a main road, intersecting PA 309 (N-S) before passing into Tamaqua and Nesquehoning.

It has a warm-summer humid continental climate (Dfb) and average temperatures range from 24.3 °F in January to 69.3 °F in July. The hardiness zone is borderline between 5b and 6a, meaning that the approximate average annual absolute minimum temperature is -10° F.

Demographics

As of the census of 2000, there were 4,647 people, 2,113 households, and 1,210 families residing in the borough. The population density was 9,060.8 people per square mile (3,518.1/km2). There were 2,595 housing units at an average density of 5,059.8 per square mile (1,964.6/km2). The racial makeup of the borough was 98.79% White, 0.22% African American, 0.09% Native American, 0.22% Asian, 0.22% from other races, and 0.47% from two or more races. Hispanic or Latino of any race were 1.29% of the population.

There were 2,113 households, out of which 22.7% had children under the age of 18 living with them, 37.2% were married couples living together, 13.8% had a female householder with no husband present, and 42.7% were non-families. 39.5% of all households were made up of individuals, and 24.9% had someone living alone who was 65 years of age or older. The average household size was 2.20 and the average family size was 2.92.

In the borough the population was spread out, with 21.3% under the age of 18, 6.8% from 18 to 24, 24.9% from 25 to 44, 21.0% from 45 to 64, and 26.0% who were 65 years of age or older. The median age was 43 years. For every 100 females, there were 89.3 males. For every 100 females age 18 and over, there were 84.6 males.

The median income for a household in the borough was $24,347, and the median income for a family was $32,033. Males had a median income of $29,628 versus $20,288 for females. The per capita income for the borough was $14,369. About 12.6% of families and 17.4% of the population were below the poverty line, including 22.3% of those under age 18 and 20.9% of those age 65 or over.

Education
Mahanoy Area School District serves the borough and includes an elementary, middle school, and high school complex for students.

Notable people
 Joe Boley (1896–1962), Major League Baseball player, two-time World Series champion
 Joe Dugan (1897–1982), former Baseball player and member of the New York Yankees first World Series title in 1923.
 David Huebner (b. 1960), US Ambassador to New Zealand and Samoa
 Joseph Edward Kurtz (b. 1946), current archbishop of Roman Catholic Archdiocese of Louisville and former bishop of Roman Catholic Diocese of Knoxville
Brandi Levy (b. 2001) litigant before the US Supreme Court for strengthening free speech rights in American public schools and former junior varsity cheerleader
 Paul Marks (1926-2020), scientist and former president of Memorial Sloan Kettering Cancer Center
 Jack McCloskey (1925–2017), basketball coach and general manager
 Ron Northey (1920–1971), Major League Baseball outfielder
 James J. Rhoades (1941–2008), former Republican state senator of Pennsylvania's 29th district
 Kevin C. Rhoades (b. 1957), ninth bishop of Roman Catholic Diocese of Harrisburg and current bishop of Fort Wayne-South Bend
 Victor Schertzinger (1890–1941), Academy Award winning composer, film director, producer and screenwriter
 George Senesky (1922–2001), professional basketball player and coach
 John Walson, (1915–1993) cable TV inventor and operator

References

External links

 Mahanoy Area Historical Society Official Site
 

Populated places established in 1859
Municipalities of the Anthracite Coal Region of Pennsylvania
Boroughs in Schuylkill County, Pennsylvania
Coal towns in Pennsylvania
1863 establishments in Pennsylvania
Pennsylvania placenames of Native American origin